is a 2018 Japanese film based on manga series Perfect World by Rie Aruga. It is a love story between a protagonist disabled by an accident and the heroine who cares deeply for him. Directed by Kenji Shibayama, it stars Takanori Iwata and Hana Sugisaki, alongside a supporting cast featuring Kenta Suga, Sei Ashina, Aya Ōmasa, Magy, Kazue Itoh , Mantaro Koichi, and Naomi Zaizen.

It was released in Japan on October 5, 2018 and grossed 622 million yen in total.

Plot

Cast 
 Takanori Iwata as Itsuki Ayukawa, an architect who is disabled in the lower part of his body due to an accident and is reliant on a wheelchair. He was popular in high school and was good at playing basketball.
 Hana Sugisaki as Tsugumi Kawana, an interior decorator. she has had a crush on Ayukawa since high school,but she never reveals her feeling to him.She meets him again in Tokyo and starts dating him.  She is good at drawing.
 Kenta Suga as Hirotaka Koreda, Kawana's friend from high school who is very fond of her.
 Sei Ashina as Aoi Nagasawa, Ayukawa's Care helper.
 Aya Ōmasa as Miki Yukimura, Ayukawa's ex-girlfriend.
 Magy as Tsuyoshi Watanabe, Ayukawa's boss.
 Kazue Itoh as Sakiko Kawana,Kawana's mother.
 Mantaro Koichi as Motohisa Kawana, Kawana's father.
 Naomi Zaizen as Fumino Ayukawa, Ayukawa's mother.

Release 
Perfect world was released in Japan on October 5, 2018 in 323 cinema, and was released in Hong Kong on November 1 of the same year, before its Korean release on April 4, 2019 and Taiwan's release on August 7, 2020.

Marketing 
On June 10, 2017, it was announced that a live-action film co-starred by Takanori Iwata and Hana Sugisaki based on manga Perfect World was being made, and would finish shooting in July. The first teaser of the film was released on March 31, 2018, as the release date of the film was set on October 15, 2018. The first poster was released on April 21, before the release of the official poster on July 18, and followed by a series of stills release from August to October. A trailer was released on July 4, announcing that Kenta Suga and Sei Ashina has also joined the cast. Another trailer was released on August 23, using "Perfect World", the theme song of the film by E-girls, as background music. A series of events for fans and media were held before and after the release of the film on September 4, September 26,and October 6 in Tokyo to promote the film, with the main cast including  Takanori Iwata and Hana Sugisaki attending.

Reception

Box office 
Despite the affect of Typhoon, the  film grossed 17.38 million yen on its opening weekend, and was ranked No.4 at the Japanese box office. It grossed 622 million in total.

Critical response 
Film critic Toyama Shinya deemed the film as an "idol film", but he found some scenes and cuts from the film similar to Yasujirō Ozu's Tokyo Story.

References

External links 
 

2018 films
2010s Japanese-language films
2018 romantic drama films
Japanese romantic drama films
Films about disability
Live-action films based on manga
2010s Japanese films